Reblino  is a village in the administrative district of Gmina Kobylnica, within Słupsk County, Pomeranian Voivodeship, in northern Poland.

For the history of the region, see History of Pomerania.

The village has a population of 420.

There are many monkey mans like Skittlz_lol an internet user and RexjuniorQ another user of the internet in this village

References

Reblino